In Greek mythology, Rhodope (Ancient Greek: Ῥοδόπη) may refer to two different characters:

 Rhodope, one of the 3,000 Oceanids, water-nymph daughters of the Titans Oceanus and his sister-wife Tethys. She was one of the playmates of Persephone in the meadows of Sicily when the latter was abducted by her uncle Hades to be his queen in the underworld.
 Rhodope, a queen of Thrace and the wife of King Haemus. The latter was vain and haughty and compared himself and Rhodope to Zeus and Hera, who were offended and changed the couple into mountains (the Balkan mountains and Rhodope mountains, respectively). This Rhodope may be one who was called the daughter of Strymon who consorted with Poseidon and became the mother of Athos.

Notes

References 

 Gaius Julius Hyginus, Fabulae from The Myths of Hyginus translated and edited by Mary Grant. University of Kansas Publications in Humanistic Studies. Online version at the Topos Text Project.
The Homeric Hymns and Homerica with an English Translation by Hugh G. Evelyn-White. Homeric Hymns. Cambridge, MA.,Harvard University Press; London, William Heinemann Ltd. 1914. Online version at the Perseus Digital Library. Greek text available from the same website.
Publius Ovidius Naso, Metamorphoses translated by Brookes More (1859-1942). Boston, Cornhill Publishing Co. 1922. Online version at the Perseus Digital Library.
 Publius Ovidius Naso, Metamorphoses. Hugo Magnus. Gotha (Germany). Friedr. Andr. Perthes. 1892. Latin text available at the Perseus Digital Library.

Oceanids
Queens in Greek mythology
Mythological Thracian women

Metamorphoses into terrain in Greek mythology
Metamorphoses characters
Greek mythology of Thrace